Ebrahim Al-Cattan (born 20 August 1963) is a Kuwaiti fencer. He competed in the team épée event at the 1980 Summer Olympics.

References

External links
 

1963 births
Living people
Kuwaiti male épée fencers
Olympic fencers of Kuwait
Fencers at the 1980 Summer Olympics